Hot February Night is a 2007 album by alternative comedian Neil Hamburger. It was originally released by Off-Price Value Center in 2007 and then re-issued on LP by Drag City in 2010.

Album synopsis

The Album was recorded live in Madison Square Garden as Hamburger acting as the opening act to Tenacious D. A number of times throughout the album Hamburger mocks the crowd for their impatience and insults them by pretending to announce the band only to quickly change tack and continue on with the act.

Track listing

"Christmas/Godfather" (6:38)
"Rock and Roll Will Never Die" (1:04)
"Shoulder Trouble '07" (0:10)
"Wonderful Wonderful" (4:21)
"Destroying the Mood" (2:10)
"Incident in Kabul" (1:55)
"Beatle Paul" (4:47)
"Decrepit Old Dogs" (2:45)
"Cranberry Sauce" (6:45)
"His Deathbed" (2:26)

Gregg Turkington albums
Drag City (record label) albums
2007 albums